Voivodeship Road 100 (abbreviated DW 100) is a route in the Polish voivodeship roads network. It runs through the Pomeranian Voivodeship leading from Rumia, and into Pierwoszyno where it meets Voivodeship road 101. The road runs through an old German Air Force military airfield.

Major cities and towns along the route 

Rumia
Pierwoszyno

Route plan

References 

100